Roxy Rocket (Roxanne Sutton) is a comic book supervillainess. Originally created in 1994 for The Batman Adventures Annual #1, a series published by DC Comics, based on Batman: The Animated Series, Roxy was incorporated into The New Batman Adventures in the episode "The Ultimate Thrill", which first aired on September 14, 1998. Shortly thereafter, Roxy appeared in "Knight Time", an episode of Superman: The Animated Series. Roxy later appeared in several comic books based on the TV show. In 2006, the character was introduced to the main DC Universe.

Fictional character biography

DC Animated Universe
Roxy Rocket was first seen in the projects in the DC Animated Universe, voiced by Charity James.

In her appearance on The New Batman Adventures, Roxanne "Roxy Rocket" Sutton was formerly a stunt double for a Hollywood actress. However, she lost her job after she tried to make her stunts too dangerous for any company to insure her. Out of work, but still hungering for thrills, Sutton began stealing jewels for Penguin, while slightly seducing him as well as ignoring his advise to tone down her reckless antics. Unlike other villains in Gotham City, Roxy's crimes were fairly benign. She was always the one being put at risk. Batman also took risks in his attempts to catch Roxy in midair chases, leading Roxy to believe Batman was a kindred spirit who understood the pleasure of risk-taking. In the end, however, Roxy realized her feelings were unrequited when Batman had her arrested as the police approach the area. When she asked what this was, Batman quoted "My game and you lost".

Roxy next appeared in "Knight Time", an episode of Superman: The Animated Series. In what amounts to a cameo appearance, Roxy tries her luck in Metropolis where she ends up tipping off Superman to the fact that Batman is conspicuously absent in Gotham. Unlike Batman (who cannot fly), Superman picks Roxy off her rocket speeder with no effort at all. The episode eventually leads to a team-up between Robin and Superman.

Roxy Rocket appears in The Batman Adventures Annual #1 where she vows to "straighten up and fly right". She is seen robbing a safe on a security camera, but it turns out she was framed by Catwoman. Angered at this, she tries, along with Batman, to apprehend her which results in a fight between the two women. Catwoman tries to hold her hostage with the intent of killing her but Roxy manages to get away and knocks her off the rooftop with a punch. Roxy makes the effort to save her but Catwoman slashes her hand instead choosing to fall down into the alleyway below. Roxy expresses worry and extreme remorse thinking that she has killed her but Batman reassures her that Catwoman still has "eight more lives".

In Justice League Adventures #6, Hawkgirl posed as Roxy Rocket.

In Justice League Adventures #10, Roxy Rocket made a cameo where she uses a rocket pack instead of her usual rocket speeder.

Comics
Roxy Rocket makes a cameo appearance in the pages of Detective Comics #822, written by Paul Dini. She is trying to shake Batman off her rocket after she has stolen ion thruster plans from Gotham's S.T.A.R. Labs, but this does not work. They crash high on the Sprang River Bridge and it takes Batman an hour and a half to get them both down. This is her first appearance in the DC Universe.

After a lengthy absence from the DCU, Roxy made her first proper appearance in Batgirl #6-7, as one of the villains in Roulette's game, and is shown battling the new Batgirl, Stephanie Brown in the Batgirl #7 cover.

Roxy appeared in Batman: Black and White #1. Her encounter with Batman mirrored her first appearance in the DCAU.

Roxy Rocket appeared in Batman Li'l Gotham #5, 6, 14 and 17.

She also appears in Batman: White Knight #3-4, as part of a group of mind-controlled villains. She latter appears in the sequel storyline Batman: Curse of the White Knight, being among the villains murdered by Azrael.

Analysis
Series producer and writer Paul Dini has said that Roxy had always been a favorite of his: "She's a character Bruce Timm and I created for the first Batman Adventures Annual. We always liked her, so we created a television story for her. Sparks fly in that one".

Bruce Timm called the television episode "probably the most blatantly risque episode we've ever done".

Powers and abilities
Roxy has no powers, but displays an exceptional skill in acrobatics and stunts due to her former employment as a stunt double. She has a skill in flying her trademark rocket, and has enough knowledge in mechanics to be able to repair it.

She is also very skilled in hand to hand combat, as she was able to easily defeat Jay, Lark, and Raven, the Penguin's henchwomen, who have been trained so well they were fighting on par and sometimes gaining the upper hand on Batwoman.

In other media

Television 
 Roxy Rocket appears in Superman: The Animated Series and The New Batman Adventures, voiced by Charity James. 
 Roxy Rocket appears in the Justice League Action episode "The Fatal Fare", voiced by Gillian Jacobs. This version is a former daredevil who started a space transportation service that comes into conflict with the taxi company that Space Cabbie works for.

Video games 
 Roxy Rocket appears in the video game Batman: Chaos in Gotham as a level 4 sub-boss.

See also
 List of Batman family enemies

References

External links 
 Roxy Rocket at DCAU Wiki
 Roxu Rockey at Comic Vine

DC Comics female supervillains
Fictional stunt performers
Batman: The Animated Series characters
DC Animated Universe original characters
Comics characters introduced in 1994
Characters created by Bruce Timm
Female characters in animated series
Animated human characters